Waadah Island is an island situated in the Strait of Juan de Fuca, just north of Neah Bay in northwestern Clallam County, Washington, United States.  The island has a land area of 164,940 square meters (40.76 acres) and has no human population.

References
Waadah Island: Block 1066, Census Tract 9801, Clallam County, Washington United States Census Bureau

Landforms of Clallam County, Washington
Islands of Washington (state)
Uninhabited islands of Washington (state)
Pacific islands of Washington (state)
Washington placenames of Native American origin